Michael Schutte (born July 28, 1979) is a Canadian former professional ice hockey player who last played for the Coventry Blaze of the Elite Ice Hockey League (EIHL).

Playing career
After three seasons with the University of Maine, where he made the 2002 NCAA Division I Men's Ice Hockey All-Tournament Team, Schutte signed with the Phoenix Coyotes on May 23, 2002. He would spend the next five seasons bouncing around various American Hockey League (AHL) and ECHL teams; namely, the Springfield Falcons, Lowell Lock Monsters, Houston Aeros, Dayton Bombers, Cincinnati Mighty Ducks, Trenton Titans, Providence Bruins, Norfolk Admirals and Toronto Marlies. He would then spend three seasons with teams in Germany's DEL2, and then, after one season off, finished his career with one season each with the Odessa Jackalopes, HC Alleghe and, finally, the Coventry Blaze.

Personal life
Schutte has two children - a daughter born in 2008, and a son born in 2012 - with his wife.

Career statistics

Awards and honours

References

External links

1979 births
Living people
Canadian ice hockey defencemen
Cincinnati Mighty Ducks players
Coventry Blaze players
Dayton Bombers players
Grizzlys Wolfsburg players
HC Alleghe players
Heilbronner Falken players
Houston Aeros (1994–2013) players
Maine Black Bears men's ice hockey players
Lowell Lock Monsters players
Norfolk Admirals players
Odessa Jackalopes players
Providence Bruins players
Schwenninger Wild Wings players
Sportspeople from Burlington, Ontario
Springfield Falcons players
Toronto Marlies players
Trenton Devils players
Canadian expatriate ice hockey players in the United States
Canadian expatriate ice hockey players in Italy
Canadian expatriate ice hockey players in Ukraine
Canadian expatriate ice hockey players in Germany
Canadian expatriate ice hockey players in England
Canadian expatriate ice hockey players in Austria